San Gavino Monreale (Sardinian: Santu ‘Engiu) is a comune (municipality) in the Province of South Sardinia in the Italian region Sardinia, located about  northwest of Cagliari, and roughly halfway between the latter and the town of Oristano.

San Gavino Monreale borders the following municipalities: Gonnosfanadiga, Pabillonis, Sanluri, Sardara, Villacidro. It is home to a castle.

History
The area of San Gavino was already settled in the Nuragic era, but the centre is of medieval origin. It was a possession of the Giudicato of Arborea and, later, of the Aragonese, being mostly destroyed in the ensuing war. Subsequently it was a fief of the Centelles and of the Osorio families, who held it until 1839.

People 
 Fabio Aru, cyclist
 Raimondo Inconis, musician

External Sources

 San Gavino village school

References

External links
 San Gavino Monreale . Net Italian website dedicated to San Gavino Monreale

Cities and towns in Sardinia
Castles in Italy